Pallavaneswarar Temple (பல்லவனேஸ்வரர் கோயில்) is a Hindu temple located in the town of Kaveripoompattinam or Puhar, Mayiladuthurai, an archaeological site in Tamil Nadu, India. The temple is dedicated to Shiva. It is situated on the birthplace of Saivite saint Pattinathar.
The presiding deity is Shiva. He is called as Pallavaneswarar. His consort is known as Soundaryanayaki.

Significance 
It is one of the shrines of the 275 Paadal Petra Sthalams - Shiva Sthalams glorified in the early medieval Tevaram poems by Tamil Saivite Nayanar Tirugnanasambandar. A Pallava king is believed to have attained salvation in this place.

Structure
In front of the rajagopura, temple tank is found. At the left of the sanctum sanctorum shrines of goddess and Palliyarai are found. Nandi and balipeeta are also found here.  In the prakara shrines of Pattinattar, Vinayaka, Subramania and Chandikesvara are found. In the kosta of the presiding deity Dakshinamurti, Lingodbhava, Brahma and Durga are found.

Literary mention 
Tirugnanasambandar describes the feature of the deity as:

Kumbhabhishekham
Inscriptions pertaining to the conduct of Kumbhabhishekham of this temple are found. They were held on 20 August 1958, 5 April 1995 and 17 March 2008.

References

External links

Photogallery

Shiva temples in Mayiladuthurai district
Padal Petra Stalam